Imperial Metals Corporation, known as IMI Imperial Metals Inc. until 2002, is a Canadian metals and mining company. Engaging in the acquisition, exploration, development, mining, and production of base and precious metals in North America, the majority of its holdings and operations are in British Columbia.

In 2016 the Company produced 119.17 million pounds of copper, 94,930 ounces gold and 330,960 ounces silver from its Mount Polley and Red Chris mines.

Operations

Imperial has one operating mine in British Columbia, two mines in care and maintenance in British Columbia, and two exploration stage projects also in British Columbia currently under development.

Mount Polley Mine (Care & Maintenance As of January 8, 2019) 

The Mount Polley mine located 100 km northeast of Williams Lake, British Columbia is an open pit copper/gold mine that started operation in 1997. Exploration on the property continues concurrent to mining operations with the expected lifetime of the mine expiring in 2025. In August 2014 the mine was the site of a dam breach. In the short term after the breach, the mining company faced protests by local activists including members of the Secwepemc Nation.

Red Chris Project

The Red Chris project is an operating open-pit copper/gold. The mine property is located outside of the community of Iskut, with the Klappan River flowing through the property less than 20 km from its confluence with the Stikine River. The mine's proximity to the Sacred Headwaters and the transboundary nature of environmental management in this region has raised concerns across the border on the Alaskan panhandle. On February 1, 2015, the Globe and Mail reported that commercial fisherman, native organizations, and the mayors of Sitka and Petersburg have released a joint statement requesting an "equal seat at the table with Canada in discussions about how and if watersheds shared by both countries are developed."

References

Companies listed on the Toronto Stock Exchange
Mining companies of Canada